Sigma Phi Beta is a college fraternity for gay, straight, bisexual, and transgender men. It was founded at Arizona State University (ASU) on September 28, 2003. It originated as the beta chapter of a now-defunct fraternity with similar values, Alpha Lambda Tau. It disaffiliated from Alpha Lambda Tau on May 11, 2003.

According to its promoters, "The fraternity creates a unique social and educational environment for its members within the traditional Greek fraternity system, while providing all open-minded men in college with career and character building opportunities. By participating in recreational, scholastic, and community service programs, the members of Sigma Phi Beta are transforming into tomorrow's reliable leaders. Sigma Phi Beta values brotherhood, diversity, leadership, education, scholarship, fraternity life, and community service. We embrace tradition while promoting positive change that moves us forward."

It organized as a national body on July 17, 2005, adopting a constitution and bylaws and electing the first fraternity council.

History
Sigma Phi Beta was established at Arizona State University in Tempe in 2003 where its first national chapter dates to 2005. Its stated objective is to provide a "uniquely diverse safe space for gay men within the traditional Greek system."

The fraternity is open to all who identify as male; the first transgender member of Sigma Phi Beta joined in 2010.

The beta chapter at Indiana University in Bloomington became a colony on November 13, 2009, and a fraternity in Fall 2010.

The gamma chapter at Ohio State University in Columbus became a chapter on March 22, 2014.

Requirements
Sigma Phi Beta requires members to:
Be enrolled as a full-time student in the college or university that the chapter is affiliated with.
Maintain a cumulative GPA of 2.5 or better.
Identify as male.

Sigma Phi Beta prioritizes gender identity over assigned gender, allowing transgender men to join. In accordance with the Fraternity's gender policy, members are not required to be legally male, or assigned male at birth.

Chapters and Colonies
Chapters
 Alpha - Arizona State University
 Beta - Indiana University - Bloomington
 Gamma chapter - Ohio State University

See also

List of LGBT and LGBT-friendly fraternities and sororities

References

Student societies in the United States
LGBT organizations in the United States
LGBT fraternities and sororities
Organizations established in 2003
LGBT in Arizona